Salamon may refer to:

Given name
 Salamon Berger (1858–1934), Croatian industrialist
 Salamon Ferenc (1825–1892), Hungarian historian
 Salamon Ferenc (water polo), Hungarian former water polo player
 Salamon Mørkved (1891–1978), Norwegian politician

Surname
 Andrzej Salamon (1936–2000), Polish swimmer
 Bartosz Salamon (born 1991), Polish professional footballer 
 Bradford J. Salamon (born 1963), American academic
 Dietmar Salamon (born 1953), German mathematician
 Ed Salamon, American entertainment industry executive
 Julian Salamon (born 1991), Austrian footballer 
 Julie Salamon (born 1953), American author
 Lester Salamon (born 1943), American academic
 Louis-Siffren-Joseph de Salamon (1750–1829), diplomat and bishop
 László Salamon (born 1947), Hungarian jurist, academic and politician
 Marina Salamon (born 1958), Italian entrepreneur
 Peter Salamon, mathematics professor
 Sergej Šalamon (born 1975), Slovenian sprinter
 Thomas Salamon (born 1989), Austrian footballer
 Ödön Salamon (Érsekújvár Hungary (1864–1903), Hungarian journalist

Other uses
 Salamon family, a Venetian noble family
 A character in Digimon Adventure

See also
 Salomon (surname), surname
 Solomon (name), surname
 Salamone, surname